Bert Willis Karlsson (born 21 June 1945) is a Swedish record company manager, entrepreneur, and former politician (Member of Parliament 1991-1994) and front figure of the New Democracy (Ny Demokrati) party.

As the owner and manager of the record company Mariann Grammofon AB, Karlsson became a familiar face to the Swedish public as the man behind Carola Häggkvist. In 1984 he started Skara Sommarland, a theme park.

In 1991, Karlsson and count Ian Wachtmeister started the populist political party New Democracy. Attracting major media attention, and with a patriotic platform, the party received 6.7 percent of the vote in the parliamentary election in September. With no previous political experience, Karlsson suddenly found himself elected to the Riksdag as a Member of Parliament.

When New Democracy imploded due to internal struggles and failed in the 1994 general election Karlsson went back to being a full-time businessman. He has started the popular Swedish reality television show Fame Factory, (a programme somewhat similar to the British show Pop Idol), in which he played an important role. Many Mariann artists have entered Melodifestivalen, the Swedish qualifications for the Eurovision Song Contest. From 1978 to 2005, approximately 120 songs from Karlsson's record company competed, and 14 of these went on to represent Sweden in the Eurovision Song contest. Mariann artists include Herreys and Charlotte Perrelli, who went on to win the Eurovision Song Contest (1984 and 1999, respectively).

In March 2005, Karlsson filled out an application for membership in the Liberal People's Party during a television interview. When the party immediately responded with criticism of him, calling the move a media stunt, he did not go through with his application.

Karlsson was a judge in the first five seasons of the TV show "Talang" on TV4, the Swedish version of America's Got Talent, between 2007–2011.

External links
 Mariann Grammofon - Official page
 "Storskalig attack gör Bert Karlsson till vinnare"- 5 March 2005 Dagens Nyheter article on Karlsson and Melodifestivalen.
 "Här blir Bert folkpartist" 30 March 2005 Aftonbladet article on Karlsson's membership application to the Liberal People's Party.
 Liberal People's Party press release- 30 March 2005 press release from the Liberal People's Party following Karlsson's statements.
 "Bert Karlsson ville bli folkpartist – men nekades"  - 30 March 2005 Aftonbladet article on Karlsson's reaction to the party press release.
/ This is the jury, Tv4.se

1945 births
Living people
People from Skövde Municipality
New Democracy (Sweden) politicians
Swedish businesspeople
Swedish record producers
Swedish entertainers
Swedish television personalities
Melodifestivalen
Political party founders